The 1961 Holtaheia Vickers Viking crash was a controlled flight into terrain incident on 9 August 1961 at Holta in Strand, Norway. The Eagle Airways (later, British Eagle) Vickers 610 Viking 3B Lord Rodney was en route from London to Stavanger Airport, Sola on an AIR Tours charter flight taking a school group for a camping holiday. The accident killed all 39 people on board.

Crash

The Viking left London at 13:29 on what was an estimated two and a half-hour charter flight.

The aircraft was destroyed and an intense fuel and oil fire followed the impact. The search for the aircraft included an RAF Shackleton and Royal Norwegian Navy ships investigating the fjords in the area.

Passengers
The 36 passengers were a school class of boys aged 13 to 16 and two teachers from Lanfranc Secondary Modern School for Boys. It was at the time the deadliest aviation incident in Norway.

Aircraft
The aircraft was a twin piston-engined Vickers 610 Viking 3B serial number 152 and registered in the United Kingdom as G-AHPM. It first flew on 2 January 1947 and was delivered new to British European Airways.

Investigation
The report into the crash put the cause down to "a deviation from the prescribed flight path for reasons unknown".

Aftermath
33 of the boys and one teacher were buried together at a communal grave at Mitcham Road Cemetery in Croydon on 17 August 1961.

Ewan MacColl wrote a song, "The Young Birds", about the accident.

References
Notes

Bibliography
"Stavanger Accident Report" Flight International, 4 October 1962,. p. 557.
"The Stavanger Tragedy" Flight, 17 August 1961 p. 240,
"Croydon remembers Lanfranc Boys after 1961 Norway air crash" BBC News 9 August 2011
 Martin, Bernard. The Viking, Valetta and Varsity. Air-Britain (Historians) Ltd. 1975. .
 "The Lanfranc Boys" By Rosalind Jones – Published by Craigmore Publications – 
 "Flystyrten i Hotaheia" By Rosalind Jones – Published by Commentum Forlag AS – 
 "The Papa Mike Air Crash Mystery" By Rosalind Jones – Published by Craigmore Publications –

External links
 Lanfranc – Holtaheia, 50th Anniversary, 9 August 2011

Aviation accidents and incidents in 1961
Aviation accidents and incidents in Norway
1961 in Norway
Accidents and incidents involving the Vickers VC.1 Viking
British Eagle accidents and incidents
Airliner accidents and incidents involving controlled flight into terrain
August 1961 events in Europe
1961 disasters in Norway